Dandougou Fakala  is a rural commune in the Cercle of Djenné in the Mopti Region of Mali. The commune contains ten villages. The administrative center (chef-lieu) is the village of Konio. In the 2009 census the commune had a population of 9,841.

References

External links
.

Communes of Mopti Region